Kenneth A De Jong  is an American computer scientist and professor at George Mason University. He is one of the pioneers in evolutionary computation.
Kenneth De Jong has been instrumental in unifying various evolutionary techniques like genetic algorithms, evolution strategies and evolutionary programming under one umbrella of evolutionary computation. He has been also instrumental in the research subfield of co-evolution in evolutionary computation, cooperative coevolution.

References

Sources
 Kenneth De Jong:  

Living people
American computer scientists
George Mason University faculty
Year of birth missing (living people)